was a governor of Miyazaki Prefecture in Japan. He was the 1974 recipient of Ramon Magsaysay Award for administrative originality in modernizing a backward prefecture in a manner congenial to the traditional minded yet attracting the young.

Career
In 1979, Kuroki was arrested and indicted on charges of accepting 30 million yen in bribes from a construction company during his sixth term in office as governor. He was sentenced to three years in prison but was subsequently acquitted in 1988.

He died of pneumonia at a hospital in Miyazaki on 24 December 2001, aged 94.

References

Japanese civil servants
People from Miyazaki Prefecture
1907 births
2001 deaths
Date of birth missing
Deaths from pneumonia in Japan